Kelowna Secondary School is a public school in Kelowna, British Columbia within School District 23.

Academics 
Kelowna Secondary School was rated 3rd in the province by the 2004/05 Fraser Sand rankings.

KSS received a 7 out of 10 overall rating from the Fraser Institute in 2020. It was ranked 63/252 out of high schools in British Columbia.

Notable alumni 

Jerod Zaleski, Montreal Alouettes player
Taylor Loffler, Winnipeg Blue Bombers player
Dianne Watts,  Former Mayor of Surrey, BC
Kevin Kane, musician and member of The Grapes of Wrath (band)
Tom Hooper and Chris Hooper, musicians and members of The Grapes of Wrath and Ginger
Nava Ashraf, economist 
Ben Cotton, actor 
Alix Hawley, author and winner of 2015 Amazon.ca First Novel Award
Naben Ruthnum, author and winner of 2013 Journey Prize
Paul Johansson, One Tree Hill (TV Series) actor
Lee Tockar, voice actor for animations such as Barbie (film series) as Bibble or Johnny Test as Bling-bling Boy.
Jared Young, Major League Baseball player

References 

High schools in Kelowna
Educational institutions in Canada with year of establishment missing